The Astrophysical Virtual Observatory (AVO) project conducted a research and demonstration programme on the scientific requirements and technologies necessary to build a virtual observatory for European astronomy. The AVO has been jointly funded by the European Commission (under FP5 - Fifth Framework Programme) with six European organisations participating in a three-year Phase-A work programme, valued at 5 million euro. The partner organisations were the  European Southern Observatory (ESO) in Munich, Germany, the European Space Agency (ESA), AstroGrid (funded by PPARC as part of the UK's E-Science programme), the CNRS-supported Centre de Données Astronomiques de Strasbourg (CDS), the University Louis Pasteur in Strasbourg, France, the CNRS-supported TERAPIX astronomical data centre at the Institut d'Astrophysique in Paris, France, and the Jodrell Bank Observatory of the Victoria University of Manchester, United Kingdom.

The Phase A program focussed its effort in the following areas:

A detailed description of the science requirements for the AVO was constructed, following the experience gained in a smaller-scale science demonstration program called ASTROVIRTEL (Accessing Astronomical Archives as Virtual Telescopes).
The difficult issue of data and archive interoperability was addressed by new standards definitions for astronomical data and trial programmes of "joins" between specific target archives within the project team.
The necessary GRID and database technologies were assessed and tested for use within a full AVO implementation.

References 
 
 Virtual Observatories initiatives worldwide, State of the projects 2006 ( www.Interquanta.biz/vos ) highlights that EURO-VO is the continuation from AVO as a Phase-B deployment of an operational VO in Europe.

External links

Its continuation project EURO-VO or European Virtual Observatory Euro-VO
AVO at ESA/Hubble

Virtual observatories
Organizations based in Europe